Village Fire is the third EP by James, released in 1985 by Factory Records. It contains all five tracks from their previously released EPs Jimone (side A) and James II (side B). The cover artwork was produced by John Carroll, whose childlike images were synonymous with much of the group's early work.

Track listing 
From Jimone:
 "What's the World" – 1:55
 "Folklore" – 2:49
 "Fire So Close" – 1:45
From James II:
 "If Things Were Perfect" – 3:00
 "Hymn from a Village" – 2:51

Personnel
Tim Booth - Vocals
Jim Glennie - Bass guitar
Paul Gilbertson (Jimone) / Larry Gott (James II) - Lead guitar
Gavan Whelan - Drums

"What's The World" was covered by The Smiths during their show at Glasgow Barrowlands, 25 September 1985.

References

James (band) EPs
1985 EPs
Factory Records EPs